Charles Montague Cooke Jr. House and Kūkaōō Heiau is a property in Honolulu, Hawaii. The house, also known as Kualii (also spelled Kualii), was built in 1911–1912 for Charles Montague Cooke Jr., and listed on the National Register of Historic Places in 1985. The listing's boundaries were increased in 2000 to include the Kūkaōō Heiau (Tax Map Keys 2-9-19:35 and 2-9-19:43, respectively).

Building history
In 1902, wealthy businessman Charles Montague Cooke (of Castle & Cooke) gave his son Monty (as Charles Montague Cooke Jr. was called) a large tract of land on a high ridge in Mānoa Valley that contained an ancient Hawaiian heiau. That was the year Monty married Lila Lefferts. In 1911, Monty hired two prominent architects, Walter Emory and Marshall Webb, to build a large stone mansion in Tudor style on the hillside above the heiau. The house cost $40,000 and was named for an ancient Hawaiian chief.

The basement and ground floor, built of basalt lava rock quarried on site, support two upper floors of half-timber and stucco. At each end of the house is a heavy stone chimney, one rising from the kitchen, the other from the living room. The central entry bay is covered by a porte-cochere with stone columns and a half gabled second floor above it, and flanked by gabled entry bays at each end of the house.

Heiau
The name of the heiau (temple of ancient Hawaii), Kūkaōō, is composed of kū 'stand' + ka 'the' + ōō 'digging stick', and has several possible translations. According to one source, it means 'Kū of the digging stick'. According to another, it means 'standing digging stick', in apparent reference to an old legend about a chief named Kawelo who was said to have thrown a digging stick from the highest mountain at the back of the valley down onto the hill where the heiau stands, known as Puu Pueo 'owl hill'.

The square-shaped heiau measures about 12 meters across and stands about 6 meters above the flat, rocky clearing on which it stands. The late Bernice P. Bishop Museum anthropologist Kenneth Emory estimated the heiau to be 1,000 years old. Its gardens used to help sustain the population of the ahupuaa of Waikiki.

In 1992, the current owners, Samuel Alexander Cooke (born 1937, grandson of Charles Montague Cooke Jr.) and Mary Cooke, purchased the land and commissioned preservationist Nathan Napoka to reconstruct the walls of the old heiau, which had been badly overgrown. Stonemason Billy Fields relied on survey drawings from the 1930s to rebuild the walls, using only rocks found on-site.

In 1996, the Mānoa Heritage Center was established to manage the site and offer educational tours.

Gallery

References

External links 

Heiau
Houses on the National Register of Historic Places in Hawaii
Houses completed in 1912
History of Oahu
Buildings and structures in Honolulu
Houses in Honolulu County, Hawaii
1912 establishments in Hawaii
National Register of Historic Places in Honolulu
Native Hawaiian culture in Honolulu